Yılmaz is a Turkish word that translates to "unshirking", "unbeatable", or "brave", and is a very common surname and occasional male given name.

Given name
Yekta Yılmaz Gül (born 1978), Turkish Greco-Roman wrestler
 Yılmaz Arslan (born 1968), Kurdish film director, screenwriter and producer
 Yılmaz Büyükerşen (born 1936), Turkish politician
 Yılmaz Erdoğan (born 1967), Turkish film director, scenarist, poet and actor
 Yılmaz Güney (1937–1984), Turkish film director, scenarist, novelist and actor
 Yilmaz Kerimo (born 1963), Swedish politician
 Yılmaz Orhan (born 1955), Turkish footballer
 Yılmaz Özlem (born 1972), Turkish footballer
 Yılmaz Vural (born 1953), Turkish football coach

Surname
 Alper Yılmaz (born 1975), Turkish basketball player
 Atıf Yılmaz (1925–2006), Turkish film director, screenwriter  and film producer
 Aydın Yılmaz (born 1988), Turkish footballer
 Ayfer Yılmaz (born 1956), Turkish female civil servant, politician and former government minister
 Betül Yılmaz (born 1988), Turkish female handball player
 Betül Nur Yılmaz, Turkish football referee
 Burak Yılmaz (born 1985), Turkish footballer
 Cem Yılmaz (born 1973), Turkish stand-up comedian, actor, cartoonist  and screenwriter
 Cem Yılmaz (rower) (born 1982), Turkish Olympian rower
 Cevdet Yılmaz (born 1967), Turkish politician
 Deniz Yılmaz (born 1988), Turkish footballer
 Dilek Akagün Yılmaz (born 1963), Turkish politician
 Durmuş Yılmaz (born 1947), Turkish economist
 Duygu Yılmaz (born 1988), Turkish women's footballer
 Fatih Yılmaz (born 1989), Turkish footballer
 Gözde Yılmaz (born 1991), Turkish female volleyball player
 Gülümser Yılmaz (born 1956), Turkish female chess player
 Hakan Yılmaz (born 1982), Turkish weightlifter
 İbrahim Yılmaz (born 1994), Turkish footballer
 Kübra Yılmaz (born 1991), Turkish female handball player
 Mahmut Yılmaz (born 1979), German footballer
 Mehmet Yılmaz (born 1988), Turkish footballer
 Mehmet Yılmaz (born 1979), Turkish footballer
 Mesut Yılmaz (1947–2020), Turkish politician
 Mustafa Yılmaz (chess player) (born 1992), Turkish Grand Master of chess
 Neşe Zara Yılmaz (born 1976), Turkish female singer
 Nevriye Yılmaz (born 1980), Turkish female basketball player
 Oğuz Yılmaz (1968–2021), Turkish musician
 Okan Yılmaz (born 1978), Turkish footballer
 Özgür Yılmaz (born 1986), Turkish footballer
 Özgür Yılmaz (born 1977), Turkish judoka
 Reyhan Yılmaz (born 2001), Turkish goalball player
 Rıdvan Yılmaz (born 2001), Turkish footballer
 Serra Yılmaz (born 1954), Turkish actress
 Şükriye Yılmaz (born 2001), Turkish female armwrestler
Tayfur Emre Yılmaz (born 1989), Turkish footballer
 Tutya Yılmaz (born 1999), Turkish female artistic gymnast
 Yağız Yılmaz (born 1993), Turkish archer
 Yaşar Yılmaz (born 1930), Turkish wrestler
 Yeliz Yılmaz (born 1980), Turkish female handball player
 Yusuf Yılmaz (born 1991), Turkish footballer

See also
 Yilmaz theory of gravitation
 Binatlı Yılmaz S.K.

Turkish-language surnames
Turkish masculine given names